Catherine Bouwkamp (born 1996) is an American wheelchair fencer.

Biography
Bouwkamp was born in Indianapolis, Indiana in 1996 with a condition called fibular hemimelia. She started competing in 2009 that's when she her first medal at Warsaw Wheelchair World Cup. In 2010, she won her first gold medal at Montreal Wheelchair World Cup. In 2010 and 2011 respectively she won 5 bronze medals at North American Cup and in 2012 added gold 2 ones from the same place for foil and sabre fencing. She also participated at U.S. Fencing National Wheelchair Championships where she won a silver medal in 2011 and 2 golds in 2012. On Parapan American Games in 2011 she also won a silver medal for épée and a gold one for foil.

References

Paralympic wheelchair fencers of the United States
1996 births
Living people
Wheelchair fencers at the 2012 Summer Paralympics
American female épée fencers
21st-century American women
American female foil fencers
American female sabre fencers